Primo Longobardo (S 524) is a  of the Italian Navy.

Construction and career
Primo Longobardo was laid down at Fincantieri Monfalcone Shipyard on 19 December 1991 and launched on 20 June 1992. She was commissioned on 14 December 1993.

The boat, during its operational life, has carried out various activities at national and international level. Among the former there are both the classic institutional activities of the armed force such as surveillance in the enlarged Mediterranean in the context of the fight against maritime terrorism, and activities related to police tasks such as the repression of drug trafficking and the control of illegal immigration, and of protection environmental such as hydrocarbon pollution monitoring. Staff training is also carried out with participation in national exercises; with the naval air forces of the Naval Squad in the Open Sea, Amphex, Tirnav and Tiraer-Tireli cycles; in collaboration with the Underwater Operating Group in rescue training for submarines damaged in the Smerex cycles; with the Incursori Operational Group and the San Marco Regiment, now brigade, in training for Special Operations. International activities include NATO campaigns in the Mediterranean, Atlantic, Red Sea and Indian Ocean; in detail he participated in the operational cycles Dog Fish, Destined Glory, Loyal Midas, Noble Manta, Noble Mariner, Proud Manta, Dynamic Guard

Although initially equipped with 6 torpedo launchers for A-184 Mod.3 wire-guided torpedoes and capable of launching mines, during an update it was prepared for the use of anti-ship missiles. During 2011, in collaboration with the NATO Underwater Research Center (NURC), the boat experimented with the latest generation of acoustic and magnetic sensors and carried out numerous tests with AUVs equipped with bistatic sona

Gallery

Citations

External links
 

1992 ships
Sauro-class submarines
Ships built by Fincantieri